A73 or A-73 may refer to:

 Benoni Defense, in the Encyclopaedia of Chess Openings
 ARM Cortex-A73, a microprocessor
 Samsung Galaxy A73 5G, an Android smartphone

Roads
 A73 motorway (Netherlands)
 A73 road, in the United Kingdom
 Quebec Autoroute 73 in Quebec
 Autovía A-73, a Spanish motorway
 Bundesautobahn 73, a German motorway also called A 73

Animals
 A73, an orca more commonly known as Springer (orca)

See also
 List of highways numbered 73